Jeronimo Bassano was an Italian musician in the Republic of Venice who is notable as the patriarch of a family of musicians: five of his sons, Anthony, Alvise, Jasper, John (Giovanni), and Baptista Bassano, moved from Venice to England to serve in the court of King Henry VIII.  They performed as a recorder consort. Jacomo Bassano was his only son to keep his primary residence in Venice. Jeronimo Bassano never moved, and he was listed in Venice as a "Maestro of the trumpets and shawms." He is believed to be the maternal grandfather of composer Giovanni Bassano.

Early life
Jeronimo was the son of Baptista "Piva" of Bassano del Grappa, a town 35 miles from Venice. Baptista was a musician who played the piva, a small bagpipe. He was the son of Andrea de Crespano, who was from the village of Crespano, about nine miles east of Bassano. Andrea, Baptista, and Jeronimo were all described as musicians and musical instrument makers.

At the beginning of the 16th century, Jeronimo moved from Bassano to Venice, where he was described as "Maestro Hieronimo", piffero player to the Doge of Venice between 1506 and 1512. The historian A.L. Rowse, in  correspondence to The Times in 1973, claimed that the Bassanos were Jewish. Roger Prior claimed in a 1995 book co-authored with Dr. David Lasocki that the family were converted Jews.

But, Giulio M. Ongaro in his "New Documents on the Bassano Family" (1992) in Early Music and Alessio Ruffatti (who did research in the archives of Bassano del Grappa assisted by Professor Pier Cesare Ioly Zorattini) argue that the Bassanos who moved to England were not of Jewish origin.

See also
Lanier family tree, which also details many of the musical Bassanos.

References

External links
The Bassano Crests
Article on Alvise

Italian musicians
Bagpipe players
15th-century births
16th-century deaths
Italian emigrants to the Kingdom of England
Lupo family